Magali Vaissière is the Director of Telecommunications and Integrated Applications at the European Space Agency (ESA), a post she has held since 2008. She is responsible for the agency's programme of Advanced Research in Telecommunications System (ARTES).

Vaissière is also head of the European Centre for Space Applications and Telecommunications (ECSAT), located at Harwell, Oxfordshire.

Biography 
Vaissière was born on 15 July 1957  in Montpellier (Hérault). After studying as an engineer at the Ecole Nationale Supérieure des Telecommunications de Paris (Telecom Paris Tech), she obtained a Master of Science from Stanford University. She also has an Executive MBA from the Centre de Perfectionnement aux Affaires.

After graduating, Vaissière worked for Thomson-CSF Radars for nine years then for EADS-Astrium Satellite for 15 years.

Awards 

 2007: Prix Irène-Joliot-Curie in the category in Women in Companies
 2008: Knighted in the Legion of Honour for services to telecommunications 
 2017: UK Space Personality of the Year 
 2018: Sir Arthur Clarke Award in the category Space Achievement by Industry/Project Individual
 2018: Forbes The World's Top 50 Women in Tech

References 

French women engineers
1957 births
European Space Agency personnel
Stanford University alumni
Living people
French telecommunications engineers